Cordillera Oriental from the Spanish language meaning "Eastern range" may refer to:

 Cordillera Oriental (Bolivia)
 Cordillera Oriental (Colombia)
 Cordillera Oriental (Ecuador)
 Cordillera Oriental (Peru)

See also

 Cordillera
 Orient (disambiguation)
 Cordillera Occidental (disambiguation)
 Cordillera Central (disambiguation)
 Eastern Range (disambiguation)